Craniofacial (cranio- combining form meaning head or skull + -facial combining form referring to the facial structures grossly) is an adjective referring to the parts of the head enclosing the brain and the face.

The term is typically used to describe an area of focus for the study and treatment of certain congenital malformations or facial injuries. The first use of the term was  1859. The first PubMed citation with the use of the term Craniofacial was in 1876 by T. H. Huxley.

See also
Craniofacial Team
Craniofacial surgery

References

Oral and maxillofacial surgery